Billy Ngawini (born 24 August 1981) is an Italian international rugby union footballer who plays for Rugby Rovigo Delta in the Top12 and Amlin Challenge Cup in Europe.

He has previously played in the National Provincial Championship and rugby league in the National Rugby League for the Canterbury-Bankstown Bulldogs and the Gold Coast Titans. He is well known in the rugby world for his stepping ability.

Background
Ngawini was born in Auckland, New Zealand. He is now a naturalised Italian.

Early career
Ngawini began his career in rugby union, having been contracted to the Waikato Chiefs Super 12 franchise for four years beginning 2001. In 2001 he was also selected in the All Black 7s training squad with the likes of Joe Rokocoko and Eric Rush.

Ngawini switched to rugby league in 2004, attracting national media attention in a standout performance for the NZ A side that beat the Kangaroo XIII in a 2005 Test.

Ngawini featured in Ngati NRL documentary on Maori TV, which follows a number of Maori boys trying to crack the Australian NRL competition.

Bulldogs career
Debut: Vs Parramatta – 14 May 2006  
Dog Years: (2) 2006, 2007

He received the opportunity to play in the NRL in Round 10 against arch-rivals Parramatta. He went on to play a further two games in the top grade against the Cronulla-Sutherland Sharks the following week and then in Round 14 against the Canberra Raiders.

Gold Coast Titans
Ngawini moved from the Canterbury club to the Gold Coast Titans for the 2008 NRL season.

Debut: vs Wests Tigers, 7 September 2008

Gold Coast Breakers
Ngawini left the Gold Coast Titans at the end of the 2008 NRL season to move back to rugby union, and began the transition by joining the Gold Coast Breakers squad in the Queensland Premier Rugby.

Debut: Vs Souths – 4 April 2009

He made an exciting start to the 2009 season for the Breakers, playing at fullback and first-five. His excellent footwork, fast pace, accurate passing and deft offloads assisted in many scoring plays. Helped the Breakers climb to second in the competition table after eleven rounds.

Despite only playing the first half of the season (due to his move to Leinster), Ngawini had the third highest number of votes in the Alec Evans Medal for the best and fairest player in the Queensland Premier Rugby.

During his time playing rugby union on the Gold Coast, he was also selected to play for the Queensland Reds 2nd XV.

Leinster Rugby
He played with Leinster Rugby at the beginning of the 2009–10 Magners League. He was selected for the Leinster squad for the pre-season match vs Rugby Nice Côte d'Azur Université-Racing, scoring an impressive try in the 66th minute on debut for Leinster. He also played for Leinster versus London Irish.

Visa issues prevented his continuation with Leinster.

Nice Rugby
Ngawini signed with Rugby Nice Côte d'Azur Université-Racing (RNCA) in 2009.

Italian Super 10
After three hugely successful years with Rugby Club I Cavalieri Prato including a well publicised performance against Stade Francais in the Amlin Challenge Cup, Ngawini moved to Rugby Rovigo Delta as part of an extensive recruitment drive by the club.

He quickly became a crowd favourite at Rugby Rovigo Delta, scoring 15 tries in his first season alone, winning the accolade of most tries scored in Italy in the 2013/14 season.

Wicklow RFC
For the 2017/2018 season he joined Irish Junior rugby team Wicklow Town RFC, playing in Leinster Division 1A, deploying his step alongside such greats as Dean H Leonard and Tommy O Donovan. Playing at scrum half and winger Billy scored many tries and received many many yellow cards.

References

External links
Gold Coast Titans profile
Bulldogs profile
Cavalieri profile

1981 births
New Zealand rugby league players
New Zealand rugby union players
New Zealand Māori rugby league players
Canterbury-Bankstown Bulldogs players
Gold Coast Titans players
Papakura Sea Eagles players
Cavalieri Prato players
Rugby league halfbacks
Rugby league hookers
Living people
Chiefs (rugby union) players
Leinster Rugby players
Rugby Rovigo Delta players
Male rugby sevens players
Italy international rugby sevens players
New Zealand sportsmen
New Zealand emigrants to Italy